Aleksandar Simeonov  (born January 6, 1986) is a Bulgarian volleyball player, a member of the club VC CSKA Sofia

Sporting achievements

Clubs 
Bulgarian Championship:
  2004, 2005, 2006, 2009
  2007, 2019
  2010, 2014, 2017
Bulgarian Cup:
  2004, 2006, 2019
Iranian Championship:
  2012
Belarusian Championship:
  2013
MEVZA:
  2015
Austrian Championship:
  2015

References

External links
Lega Volley profile
MaximusSport profile
Volleybox profile
CEV profile
ENDISPORTMA profile 

1986 births
Living people
Sportspeople from Sofia
Bulgarian men's volleyball players
Panathinaikos V.C. players